William Bassett (1507 – 10 March 1586) was an Anglo-Welsh gentleman and parliamentarian from Glamorgan, Wales.

Life

William Bassett was born in 1507.
His family had been settled in Glamorgan since the 13th century.
He was the first son of William Bassett of Beaupré and Margaret Fleming, daughter of William Fleming of Flemingston.
His grandfather was Jenkin Basset.
During the Protestant Reformation there was some hostility to the supposed curative powers of the springs of Buxton, supposed to derive from some spiritual agency.
Basset's father wrote from Langley to Lord Thomas Cromwell saying that he had sealed up the baths and wells and awaited instructions.
The prohibition does not seem to have lasted long.

William married Catherine Mansell (died 1593), daughter of Sir Rice Mansel of Margam, from another parliamentary family.
They had at least three sons and two daughters.
William Bassett was a Justice of the Peace in Glamorgan from 1561 and Sheriff of Glamorgan in 1557–58 among other offices.
He was Knight of the Shire in the 1563–67 and 1571 parliaments.
He owned various properties in Glamorgan and Gloucestershire including the manors of Saint Hilary, Tregrove and Llantrithyd, and the advowsons of Penmark, Landore and Cardiff.

William Bassett died on 10 March 1586 aged 80, leaving most of his property to his eldest son Arnold Bassett.
He left Beaupré to his widow.
His wife, Katheryne, died on 10 March 1593 at the age of 80.

It is said that the bard Meurig Dafydd once presented a praise poem to Bassett.
Basset read the poem, confirmed that it was the only copy, paid the bard, rebuked him for his unsatisfactory work and threw the manuscript into the hall fire, saying, "By my honestie I swere yf there bee no copie of this extante, none shall there ever bee."

Notes

Sources

1507 births
1586 deaths
16th-century English MPs